Lada class, Russian designation Project 677 Lada (meaning "Lada", NATO reporting name St. Petersburg) is the new advanced class of diesel-electric attack submarine designed by the Russian Rubin Design Bureau. A program to develop a "fourth generation" diesel-electric submarine, it aimed to produce a highly improved version of the Project 636 with better acoustic signature, new combat systems and possibly air-independent propulsion. However, in 2019, Alexander Buzakov, the head of the Admiralty Shipyard, indicated that there were no plans to equip the Lada class with an air-independent propulsion system. In July 2022 it was reported that work on an electrochemical generator to produce hydrogen from diesel fuel and oxygen was continuing and that the Rubin Central Design Bureau signed a new contract in 2019 to continue work. This was scheduled to be completed by the mid-2020s.

History
The lead boat of the class, named , was launched in October 2004 and began sea trials in November 2005. The submarine was transferred to the Russian Navy in April 2010. 

Another two vessels were under construction at the Admiralty Shipyard with plans to launch four to six submarines by 2015. In 2009, the Russian Navy had set out a requirement for a total of eight St. Petersburg-class submarines.

However, in November 2011 the Russian Navy decided that this class of submarines would not be accepted into service, as the lead boat had fallen far short of requirements during tests.  The lead boat was retained as a test vessel to experiment with various systems. The construction of the remaining boats of the class was frozen.

On 27 July 2012, the Russian Navy commander-in-chief announced the resumption of the construction of the St. Petersburg-class submarines, having undergone extensive design changes. In 2013 and 2015, two further boats were re-laid and commissioning was expected in 2017 and 2018.

On 20 September 2018, the first serial submarine of the class, B-858 Kronshtadt, was launched at the Admiralty Shipyards in St. Petersburg.

Indonesia had once indicated its interest in acquiring two St. Petersburg-class submarines, but the deal fell through before 2010 due to financing issues.

In June 2017, the Russian Navy announced it planned to order two more Lada-class submarines, and the build contract was signed in June 2019, during the International Military-Technical Forum «ARMY-2019». One more sub was ordered in August 2020, during the International Military-Technical Forum «ARMY-2020», with some speculation that all six of the submarines currently on order, or alternatively up to six of the eventual total number of Lada-class boats, might eventually be deployed with the Baltic Fleet.

Design

The project 677 St. Petersburg is a Russian diesel-electric submarine developed in the late 1990s. The submarine is designed for anti-submarine and anti-surface warfare, defense of naval bases, seashore and sea lanes, as well as for conducting reconnaissance. The class marks the first usage of a mono-hull design by the Russian navy for an attack submarine since the 1940s.

The class is designed for an endurance of 45 days with a complement of 35.

The submarine is equipped with automated combat control system Litiy, (eng. "Lithium").

A variant designated as the project 1650  is offered as an export model.

Units

See also
 Future of the Russian Navy
 List of submarine classes in service
 Cruise missile submarine

Submarines of similar comparison
 Type 212 submarine - A class of diesel-electric attack-submarines developed by ThyssenKrupp Marine Systems and exclusively built for the German Navy, the Italian Navy and the Royal Norwegian Navy.
 Type 214 submarine - A class of export-oriented diesel-electric attack-submarines, also developed by ThyssenKrupp Marine Systems and currently operated by the Hellenic Navy, the Portuguese Navy, the Republic of Korea Navy and the Turkish Naval Forces.
 Type 218SG submarine - A class of extensively-customised diesel-electric attack-submarines developed ThyssenKrupp Marine Systems and currently operated by the Republic of Singapore Navy.
  - A class of extensively-customised diesel-electric attack-submarines developed by ThyssenKrupp Marine Systems and currently operated by Israel.
  - A unique class of  diesel-electric attack-submarines developed by ThyssenKrupp Marine Systems and currently being built for Israel.
  - A class of export-oriented diesel-electric attack-submarines, jointly developed by Naval Group and Navantia and currently operated by the Chilean Navy, the Royal Malaysian Navy, the Indian Navy and the Brazilian Navy.
 S-80 Plus submarine - A class of conventionally-powered attack-submarines, currently being built by Navantia for the Spanish Navy.
 Blekinge-class submarine is a class of submarine developed by Kockums for the Swedish Navy
 KSS-III submarine - A class of diesel-electric attack submarines, built by Daewoo Shipbuilding & Marine Engineering and Hyundai Heavy Industries and operated by the Republic of Korea Navy.
  - A class of diesel-electric attack-submarines, built by Mitsubishi Heavy Industries for the Japan Maritime Self-Defense Force.
  - A class of diesel-electric attack submarines currently being built by Mitsubishi Heavy Industries and Kawasaki Heavy Industries for the Japan Maritime Self-Defense Force
 Type 039A submarine - A class of diesel-electric attack-submarines operated by the People's Liberation Army Navy (China) and being built for the navies of the Royal Thai Navy and the Pakistan Navy.

Notes

References

External links

 
 Project-677 class submarine set for final sea trials
 
 Завершаются ходовые испытания подводной лодки "Санкт-Петербург" 24 января 2007 Russian version of the above translation
 Video about Sankt Petersburg

 
Attack submarines